This is a list of the banks in the Americas.

Largest banks in the Americas 
The 15 largest banks in the Americas by total assets, as of 2019.

Argentina
See :Category:Banks of Argentina

Bahamas

Central bank
Central Bank of The Bahamas

Government-owned banks
Bank of The Bahamas International
Commonwealth Bank

Commercial banks
Citibank
Fidelity Bank
Finance Corporation of The Bahamas
FirstCaribbean International Bank
Royal Bank of Canada
Scotiabank

Barbados

Central bank 
Central Bank of Barbados

Commercial banks

Foreign-owned banks 
CIBC FirstCaribbean International Bank
First Citizens
RBTT Bank Barbados limited; subsidiary of RBTT Financial Holdings Limited (RBTT)
RBC Financial Caribbean; branch of Royal Bank of Canada (RBC)
Scotiabank

Development banks 
Caribbean Development Bank (CDB)

Belize

Central bank
 Central Bank of Belize

Development bank
 National Bank of Belize Limited

Major privately owned banks
 Belize Bank Ltd.
 Scotiabank (Belize Limited)
 Alliance Bank of Belize Limited; now known as Heritage Bank Limited
 Atlantic Bank Limited
 CIBC First Caribbean International Bank

Bermuda
The Bank of N. T. Butterfield & Son Limited
HSBC Bank of Bermuda Limited
Bermuda Commercial Bank Limited
Clarien Bank

Bolivia

Central bank
Central Bank of Bolivia

Law-recognized state banks
Banco Unión

Second-floor banks 

 Banco de Desarrollo Productivo

Multiple banks
Banco BISA
Banco de Crédito BCP
Banco Económico
Banco Fassil
Banco FIE
Banco Fortaleza
Banco Ganadero
Banco Mercantil Santa Cruz
Banco Nacional de Bolivia
Banco Prodem
BancoSol

Small and Medium Enterprise-focused Banks 

 Banco PyME Ecofuturo
 Bancomunidad

Foreign banks
ABN AMRO
Banco de la Nación Argentina

Defunct banks
Banco Agrícola de Bolivia
Banco Boliviano Americano
Banco de Credito Oruro
Banco de Cochabamba
Banco de Financiamiento Industrial
Banco de La Paz
Banco de la Vivienda
Banco de Potosí
Banco de San Carlos
Banco del Progreso
Banco Intenacional de Desarrollo
Banco Minero de Bolivia
Banco PyME Los Andes ProCredit
Banco Santa Cruz
Banco Sur
BHN Multibanco
Citibank

Brazil

Central bank
Central Bank of Brazil

Development banks
National Bank for Economic and Social Development (BNDES) (Federal Government-owned)
Espírito Santo Development Bank (BANDES) (State of Espírito Santo-owned)
Minas Gerais Development Bank (BDMG) (State of Minas Gerais-owned)
Far South Regional Development Bank (BRDE) (States of Paraná, Santa Catarina and Rio Grande do Sul-owned)

Major commercial banks

Government-owned banks
Banco do Brasil (Federal Government as main shareholder)
Caixa Econômica Federal (Federal Government-owned)

Private-owned banks
Itaú Unibanco
Banco Bradesco 
Banco Santander Brasil; (owned by Spanish Banco Santander)

Other commercial banks

Government-owned banks
Banco da Amazônia (Federal Government as main shareholder)
Banco de Brasília (BRB) (Federal District-owned)
Banco do Estado do Espírito Santo (Banestes) (State of Espírito Santo-owned)
Banco do Estado do Pará (Banpará) (State of Pará-owned)
Banco do Estado do Rio Grande do Sul (Banrisul) (State of Rio Grande do Sul-owned)
Banco do Estado do Sergipe (Banese) (State of Sergipe-owned)
Banco do Nordeste (Federal Government as main shareholder)

Private-owned banks
Banco Alfa
Banco BOCOM BBM (China's Bank of Communications as main shareholder)
Banco BMG 
Banco BV (co-owned by Votorantim Group and Banco do Brasil)
Banco Fibra 
Banco Industrial do Brasil
Banco Mercantil do Brasil 
Banco PAN (formerly Banco Panamericano, now owned by BTG Pactual)
Paraná Banco 
Banco Paulista 
Banco Safra 
Banco Sofisa

Online banks
Agibank
Banco Bari
Banco BS2
C6 Bank
Banco Digimais
Banco Digio
Banco Inter
Nubank
Banco Original

Cooperative banks
Banco Cooperativo do Brasil (Bancoob)
Sistema de Cooperativas de Crédito Ailos
Sistema de Cooperativas de Crédito do Brasil (Sicoob)
Sistema de Crédito Cooperativo (Sicred)
Unicred

Investment banks
 Banco BTG Pactual (private)
 Banco Clássico (private)
 Banco Modal (private)

Merged or defunct banks
 Banco Bamerindus; acquired by HSBC Bank Brasil, now Banco Bradesco
 Banco Bandeirantes; acquired by Caixa Geral de Depósitos, later merged with Unibanco, now Banco Itaú
 BankBoston Brasil; Brazilian operations acquired by Banco Itaú
 Banorte; acquired by Banco Bandeirantes, later merged with Unibanco, now Banco Itaú
 BBVA Brasil; Brazilian operations acquired by Banco Bradesco
 Banco Boavista; acquired by Banco Bradesco
 Citibank Brasil; Brazilian operations acquired by Banco Itaú
 Banco Credireal; acquired by BCN, now Banco Bradesco
 Banco de Crédito Nacional (BCN); acquired by Banco Bradesco
 Banco Econômico; merged with Banco Excel, later acquired by BBVA Brasil, now Banco Bradesco
 Banco do Estado do Amazonas (BEA); acquired by Banco Bradesco
 Banco do Estado da Bahia (Baneb); acquired by Banco Bradesco
 Banco do Estado do Ceará (BEC); acquired by Banco Bradesco
 Banco do Estado de Goiás (BEG); acquired by Banco Itaú
 Banco do Estado do Maranhão (BEM); acquired by Banco Bradesco
 Banco do Estado de Minas Gerais (Bemge); acquired by Banco Itaú
 Banco do Estado da Paraíba (Paraiban); acquired by Banco Real, now Santander Brasil
 Banco do Estado do Paraná (Banestado); acquired by Banco Itaú
 Banco do Estado de Pernambuco (Bandepe); acquired by Banco Real, now Santander Brasil
 Banco do Estado do Piauí (BEP); acquired by Banco do Brasil
 Banco do Estado do Rio de Janeiro (Banerj); acquired by Banco Itaú
 Banco do Estado de Santa Catarina (BESC); acquired by Banco do Brasil
 Banco do Estado de São Paulo (Banespa); acquired by Santander Brasil
HSBC Bank Brasil; Brazilian operations acquired by Banco Bradesco
 Banco Mercantil Finasa; acquired by Banco Bradesco
 Banco Meridional; acquired by Banco Bozano Simonsen, later merged with Santander Brasil
 Banco Nacional; acquired by Unibanco, now Banco Itaú
 Banco Nossa Caixa; acquired by Banco do Brasil
 Banco Real; formerly owned by ABN AMRO, later merged with Santander Brasil
 Banco Sudameris; acquired by Banco Real, now Santander Brasil
 Unibanco; merged with Banco Itaú

Canada

Chile

Central bank
Central Bank of Chile

Government-owned banks
Banco del Estado de Chile

Commercial banks
Banco BICE
Banco Consorcio
Banco de Chile
Banco Edwards Citi
Banco de Crédito e Inversiones
Banco Falabella
Banco Internacional
Banco Ripley
Banco Security

Foreign-owned
Banco Santander Chile (owned by Banco Santander)
Itaú Corpbanca (56,6% owned by Itaú Unibanco)
Scotiabank Chile (owned by Scotiabank)

Neobanks
Tenpo

Enterprise banks
HSBC Bank Chile

Foreign banks with representation
Banco de la Nación Argentina
Banco do Brasil
DnB NOR Bank ASA
JP Morgan Chase Bank
The Bank of Tokyo-Mitsubishi UFJ

Merged or defunct banks

Commercial banks
Banco de A. Edwards; merged with Banco de Chile.
Banco BBVA Chile; merged with Scotiabank Chile.
Banco del Desarrollo; merged with Scotiabank Chile.
Banco de Santiago; merged with Banco Santander, some assets sold to Paris.
Banco Sud Americano; bought by Scotiabank Chile.
Banco Paris; closed in 2016.
Banco Penta; assets sold to Banco de Chile.
BankBoston; Chilean operations bought by Banco Itaú.
Citibank Chile; operations merged with Banco de Chile.
Corpbanca; merged with Banco Itaú Chile.
Citibank Chile; operations merged with Banco de Chile.
Rabobank; dissolved in 2017, banking assets sold to Banco BICE.

Enterprise banks
Deutsche Bank; left the Chilean market in 2016.

Colombia

Central bank
Banco de la República

Commercial banks
Bancolombia
Banco de Bogotá
Davivienda
Citibank
BBVA Colombia
Colpatria
Itau Corpbanca Colombia
Banco Caja Social
Banco AV Villas
Banco de Occidente Credencial
Banco Popular
Bancamía
Banco Pichincha
GNB Sudameris

Government-owned banks
Agrarian Bank of Colombia

Defunct banks
Granahorrar Bank

Costa Rica

Central bank
Banco Central de Costa Rica

Government-owned banks
Banco de Costa Rica
Banco Nacional de Costa Rica
BICSA

Defunct banks
Banco Crédito Agrícola de Cartago

Commercial banks
Banco Cathay de Costa Rica
Banco CMB
BAC Credomatic
Banco Improsa
Banca Promérica
Banco Lafise
Banco BCT
Scotiabank
Banco General
Davivienda
Prival Bank

Cuba

Central bank
Central Bank of Cuba

Commercial banks
Banco de Crédito y Comercio	
Banco de Inversiones		
Banco Exterior de Cuba			
Banco Financiero Internacional			
Banco Industrial de Venezuela-Cuba			
Banco Internacional de Comercio		
Banco Metropolitano			
Banco Nacional de Cuba		
Banco Popular de Ahorro

Dominica

Commercial banks
National Bank of Dominica (NBD)

Branches of foreign banks
Republic Bank

Foreign-owned banks
FirstCaribbean International Bank (FCIB); subsidiary of CIBC

Offshore banks
Griffon Bank

Dominican Republic

Central bank
Central Bank of the Dominican Republic

Major banks
BanReservas
Banco BHD León
Banco Popular
Scotiabank
Banco del Progreso

Ecuador

Central bank
Central Bank of Ecuador

Major banks
Banco Pichincha
Banco del Pacífico
Banco de Guayaquil
Produbanco
Banco Internacional
Banco Bolivariano

El Salvador

Central bank
Central Reserve Bank of El Salvador

Major banks
Banco Agricola
Blue Bank of El Salvador
Banco G & T Continental El Salvador
Banco Davivienda El Salvador
Cuscatlan Bank

Grenada

Commercial banks
Grenada Co-operative Bank (only locally owned bank)

Branches of foreign banks
The Bank of Nova Scotia  (SCOTIABANK)
RBTT Bank Grenada Limited
Republic Bank(Grenada) Limited

Foreign-owned banks
First Caribbean International Bank (FCIB); subsidiary of CIBC

Guyana

Central Bank
Bank of Guyana

Commercial banks
Republic Bank (Guyana) (Subsidiary of Republic Bank)
Guyana Bank for Trade & Industry Ltd. (GBTI)
Demerara Bank Ltd.
Citizen's Bank Guyana Inc.

Foreign-owned banks
Scotiabank
Bank of Baroda

Honduras

Central bank
Banco Central de Honduras

Banks
Banco Atlantida
Banco FICOHSA
Banco de Occidente
Banco del Pais
Banco BAC-Bamer
Banco Promerica
Banco de Los Trabajadores
Banco Popular

Foreign Banks
Banco Azteca
Lloyds Bank
HSBC

Jamaica

Central bank
The Bank of Jamaica

Commercial banks

Locally owned banks 
First Global Bank (Parent -Grace Kennedy)

Subsidiary/branch of foreign entity 
The Bank of Nova Scotia (Parent - Scotia Bank)
Citibank Jamaica (Parent - Citibank)
First Caribbean International Bank (Parent - CIBC)
National Commercial of Jamaica (Parent -Portland Holdings)
RBTT Jamaica Limited (Parent - Royal Bank of Trinidad & Tobago)

Merchant banks

Locally owned banks
Capital & Credit Merchant Bank (Parent - Capital & Credit Financial Group)
MF&G Trust & Finance
PanCaribbean Merchant Bank

Subsidiary/branch of foreign entity
Scotia DBG (Parent -The Bank of Nova Scotia)

Mexico

Panama

Commercial local banks
Banco General (merger between Banco General and Banco Continental)
Global Bank
Multibank
Metrobank
Banco Universal
Banvivienda (part of Grupo Mundial)
Bancafé
Banco Aliado
Credicorp Bank

Government-owned banks
Banco Nacional de Panama
Caja de Ahorros de Panamá
Banco de Desarrollo Agropecuario

Foreign-owned banks
HSBC (merger between Panama's largest banking group Grupo Banistmo and HSBC Panama)
Citibank (subsidiary of Citigroup which merged with Banco Uno and Banco Cuscatlan)
Banco Bilbao Vizcaya Argentaria
Banco Atlantico Panama (subsidiary of Banco Santander)
Scotiabank

Paraguay

Central bank
Banco Central del Paraguay

Other banks

Citibank
Banco do Brasil
Banco de la Nación Argentina
Agencia Financiera de Desarrollo
BBVA
Banco Continental
Banco Familiar
Banco GNB
Banco Río
Banco Itaú
Crédito Agrícola de Habilitación
Interfisa Banco
Visión Banco

Peru

Central bank
Banco Central de Reserva del Perú

Commercial banks
Banco Azteca
BCP
BBVA Perú
Scotiabank
Interbank
HSBC
Citibank
Santander
Standard Chartered
Deutsche Bank
Banco Interamericano de Finanzas
Banco Financiero
Banco de Comercio
Mibanco
Banco Falabella
Banco Ripley
Banco del Trabajo

Development banks
Banco de Materiales
Agrobanco

Defunct banks
Banco Wiese Sudameris Sold to and rebranded as Scotiabank in 2006
Banco Sudamericano Sold to and rebranded as Scotiabank in 2006
Banco Santander Operations in Peru acquired by Banco de Credito del Peru (Santander returns to Peru in 2007)
BankBoston Peruvian operations acquired by Banco de Credito del Peru
Banco de Lima Sudameris Merged with Banco Wiese and rebranded as Banco Wiese Sudameris
NBK Bank
Banco del Pais
Banco Republica
Bancosur Merged with Banco Santander and rebranded as Banco Santander Central Hispano
Banco Solventa
Serbanco
Banco Latino Operations acquired by Interbank
Banco Interandino Acquired by Banco Santander
Banco Mercantil Acquired by Banco Santander
Banco del Progreso
Banco de Desarrollo
Banco Popular del Peru
Banco CCC
Surmeban top Gen
Banpeco
Bancoop
Banco Agrario
Banco Hipotecario
Banco Industrial del Peru
Banco Minero
Banco Comercial del Peru

Saint Lucia

Commercial banks
1st National Bank of St Lucia
Bank of Saint Lucia

Branches of foreign banks
Republic Bank
Royal Bank of Canada (RBC)

Foreign-owned banks
FirstCaribbean International Bank (FCIB); Subsidiary of CIBC

Saint Vincent and the Grenadines

Central bank 

 Eastern Caribbean Central Bank

Commercial banks
Bank of St. Vincent and the Grenadines
First Caribbean International Bank
First St. Vincent Bank
1st National Bank
Republic Bank
St. Vincent Co-operative Bank

Offshore banks
Loyal Bank Limited
United Bank Limited
European Commerce Bank
Safe Harbor Bank Ltd.
Trend Bank Ltd.
Millennium Bank Inc.

Suriname

Central bank
Central Bank of Suriname

Commercial banks
De Surinaamsche Bank
Hakrinbank
Surinaamse Volkscredietbank
Surinaamse Postspaarbank
Landbouwbank
Surichangebank
Finabank
Cooperatieve spaar- en kredietbank Godo

Foreign-owned banks
RBC Suriname; former subsidiary of the Royal Bank of Trinidad and Tobago
 Southern Commercial Bank Suriname

Trinidad and Tobago
Central Bank
The Central Bank of Trinidad and Tobago

Other Banks

Bank of Baroda Trinidad and Tobago Limited
Citicorp Merchant Bank Ltd
First Citizens Bank (Trinidad and Tobago)
Intercommercial Bank Limited
Royal Bank of Trinidad and Tobago (RBTT)
Republic Bank
Scotiabank Trinidad and Tobago Limited

United States

Uruguay

Central Bank
 Banco Central del Uruguay

State-owned
 Banco de la República Oriental del Uruguay
 Banco Hipotecario del Uruguay

Private
 Banco Bandes Uruguay S.A.
 Banco Itaú Uruguay  S.A.
 Scotiabank Uruguay S.A. (ex. Nuevo Banco Comercial S.A.)
 Discount Bank (Latin America) S.A.
 Banco Santander S.A.
 Banco Bilbao Vizcaya Argentaria Uruguay S.A.
 HSBC Bank (Uruguay) S.A.
 Banco Surinvest S.A.
 Citibank N.A. Sucursal Uruguay
 Lloyds TSB Bank plc
 Banco de la Nación Argentina

Venezuela

Central bank
Central Bank of Venezuela

Government-owned banks
Banco de Venezuela
Banco Industrial de Venezuela
BANDES
Banco Bicentenario
Women's Development Bank

Commercial banks
Bancaribe
Banco Nacional de Crédito
Banco Venezolano de Crédito
Banesco
BBVA Provincial
Fondo Común
Iran-Venezuela Bi-National Bank
100% Banco
Banco Mercantil
Banco Occidental de Descuento
Sofitasa

Defunct banks
Banco Federal
Banco Latino
Stanford Bank Venezuela

See also 
 List of largest banks
 List of largest banks in Latin America
 List of largest banks in North America
 List of largest banks in the United States

References

External links 
 List of banks in Argentina
 List of banks in the Bahamas
 List of banks in Barbados
 List of banks in Belize
 List of banks in Bermuda
 List of banks in Brazil
 List of banks in the Cayman Islands
 List of banks in the Dominican Republic
 List of banks in Guyana
 List of banks in Haiti
 List of banks in Jamaica
 List of banks in Panama
 List of banks in Trinidad and Tobago
 Central Bank of Bahamas
Banks in Brazil
 List of Mexican banks

 
 
Americas-related lists